Organ building is the profession of designing, building, restoring and maintaining pipe organs.

The  organ builder usually receives a commission to design an organ with a particular disposition of stops,  manuals, and  actions, creates a design to best respond to spatial, technical and acoustic considerations, and then constructs the instrument. The profession requires specific knowledge of such matters as the scale length of organ pipes and also familiarity with the various materials used (including woods, metals, felt, and leather) and an understanding of statics, aerodynamics, mechanics and electronics. However, although in theory the builder is responsible for all facets of construction, in practice organ-building workshops include specialists in pipes, actions, and cabinets; tasks such as the manufacture of pipes, metal casting, and making rarely-used components are often delegated to outside firms.

After manufacture of all parts of a new organ, the pipes must be pre-tuned and voiced to the desired pitch and sound characteristics. The instrument is then usually partly or wholly assembled in the workshop, dismantled, and reassembled on-site, after which the pipes receive a final tuning and voicing.

Organ builders also provide regular maintenance, which includes adjustment of pipes and maintenance of the action, and repairs necessitated by wear and tear, unforeseen problems or rough treatment (including inappropriate temperature and humidity). A complete overhaul of an organ consists of disassembly of the pipes and thorough cleaning of all components and maintenance where needed; changes and additions may also be made to the instrument at the same time. Older organs may also be restored to a previous state, including re-creation of damaged and missing parts using historically accurate materials and techniques.

In some countries, including Germany, Switzerland, and Norway, organ building is a regulated  handwork profession.

See also
 List of pipe organ builders

Further reading
 Poul-Gerhard Andersen. Orgelbogen; klangteknik, arkitektur og historie. Copenhagen: Munksgaard, 1956.  
 Poul-Gerhard Andersen. Organ Building and Design. Trans. Joanne Curnutt. New York: Oxford / London: Allen & Unwin, 1969. 
 George Ashdown Audsley. The Art of Organ-Building: A Comprehensive Historical, Theoretical, and Practical Treatise on the Tonal Appointment and Mechanical Construction of Concert-Room, Church, and Chamber Organs. 2 vols. New York, 1905. Repr. New York: Dover, 1965. 
 Walter and Thomas Lewis. Modern Organ Building: Practical Explanation and Description of Organ Construction with Especial Regard to Pneumatic Action and Chapters on Tuning, Voicing, etc. 3rd ed. London: Reeves, 1939, repr. 1956. 
 Johann Julius Seidel. Die Orgel und ihr Bau: ein systematisches Handbuch für Cantoren, Organisten, Schullehrer, Musikstudirende &c., so wie für Geistliche, Kirchenvorsteher und alle Freunde der Orgel und des Orgelspiels. Breslau, 1843. Repr. Amsterdam: Knuf, 1962.  
 Johann Julius Seidel. The Organ and its Construction: A Systematic Handbook for Organists, Organ Builders, &c. Trans. 2nd ed. London, 1855. Repr. Da Capo Press music reprint series. New York: Da Capo, 1982. 
 Martin Kares. "Die Situation des Orgelbaus in Deutschland zu Beginn des 21. Jahrhunderts". In: Die Orgel zwischen Gestern und Morgen. Bericht über das zehnte Colloquium der Walcker-Stiftung für orgelwissenschaftliche Forschung 23. – 25. September 2003 in Siegen. Veröffentlichungen der Walcker-Stiftung 18. Siegen: Universitätsbibliothek Siegen, 2011, pp. 14–15 (pdf) 
 Lawrence I. Phelps. "A Short History of the Organ Revival". Church Music 67.1, Spring 1967

External links
 The International Society of Organbuilders
 The 101 of organ building, The Organ Site
 Institute of British Organ Building
 The Associated Pipe Organ Builders of America
 Orgelbau Deutschland 

 
Pipe organ